The 1945 Green Bay Packers season was their 27th season overall and their 25th season in the National Football League. The team finished with a 6–4 record under coach Curly Lambeau, earning them a third-place finish in the Western Conference.

Offseason

NFL draft

Regular season

Schedule

Standings

Roster

Awards, records, and honors
Most points scored, quarter, 24, Don Hutson, October 7, 1945

References

 Sportsencyclopedia.com

Green Bay Packers seasons
Green Bay Packers
Green